Valeriana asterothrix is a species of plant in the family Caprifoliaceae. It is endemic to Ecuador. Its natural habitats are subtropical or tropical moist montane forests and subtropical or tropical high-altitude shrubland.

References

Endemic flora of Ecuador
asterothrix
Near threatened plants
Taxonomy articles created by Polbot